This is a list of gliders/sailplanes of the world, (this reference lists all gliders with references, where available) 
Note: Any aircraft can glide for a short time, but gliders are designed to glide for longer.

P

Pagliani
(Armando Pagiani)
 Pagliani Vittoria Armando Pagiani

Pajno 
(Vittorio Pajno)
 Pajno V-1
 Pajno V-½ Rondine
 Pajno V-3

Paknys 
(Antanas Paknys & A. Gysas)
 Paknys P-1 Uodas
 Paknys P-2 (Originally PAGY or PAGY-1 [some confuse P-2 with PAGY-2]
 Paknys PAGY-2 1938, fitted with 18–20 hp engine [sources vary as to conversion to or from motorglider]
 Paknys P-3 Nerija (Spit) 
 Paknys P-4 Termikas

Pánek 
(Přemysl Pánek)
 Pánek P-2
 Pánek P-3
 Pánek P-4
 Pánek N-26-V Ostaš 1

Pánka (glider constructor)
 Pánka 1924 primary

Paolini 
(Sfredo Paolini)
 Paolini SP-38

Parker 
(Raymond H. Parker / Richard H. Johnson)
 Parker RP9 T-Bird
 Parker-Johnson PJ-1 Tiny Mite

Parker
(W.L. Parker)
 Parker 2nd Ranger

Partenavia 
 Partenavia P-56 Zefiro
 Partenavia Sea Sky

Pascoe
(E.A. Pascoe)
 Pascoe EP-1 Spruce Goose
 Pascoe EP-2 Super Goose

Pavelek
(František Pavelek)
 Pavelek P-1 1936 PAVELEK, František
 Pavelek P-2 1937 PAVELEK, František

Payne
(A. G. Payne)
 Payne Granta

Payne
(J. H. Payne / Imperial College, London)
 Payne I.C.1

Payre
(Georges Payre)
 Payre AM-56

Peak
(The Bedford Sailplane Design Group / Peak Sailplanes Ltd. / P. Mitchelmore)
 Peak 100
 Peak 200

Peel
(Peel / Peel Glider Boat Corporation, College Point, Queens)
 Peel Z-1 Glider Boat

Pelton
(Alfred Paul Pelton)
 Pelton Hawk
 Pelton Bat
 Pelton Bronzewing
 Pelton ground training machine

Pelzner
(Willy Pelzner)
 Pelzner C
 Pelzner Hängegleiter 1920

Penrose
(Harald J. Penrose)
 Penrose Pegasus Harald J. Penrose

Peregrine Sailplanes
 Peregrine Sailplanes KR-03 (Puchatek)

Perl
(Harry Perl)
 Perl PG-130 Penetrator

Pešta
(František Pešta)
 Pešta Peta-Z

Peterson
(Max A. Peterson / Peterson Sailplane Corporation)
 Peterson J-4 Javelin
 Peterson MAP-3 Medena

Petsuha
(A. I. Petsuha)
 Petsuha PAI-6 – (Пьецуха ПАИ-6)

Peulet
(Henri Peulet / Aéro-Club de Créteil)
 Peulet PC-1 Bigorneau
 Peulet Biplace Marcel Guittard

Peyean
(K. Peyean)
 Peyean Boot I
 Peyean Boot II
 Peyean Schwalbe

Peyronnenc
(Pierre Peyronnenc)
 Peyronnenc PP-1

Pfitzner
(Alexander L. Pfitzner)
 Pfitzner american glider

Phoenix Air
(Phoenix Air sro., Letrohrad, Czech Republic)
 Phoenix Air Phoenix

Piana Canova 
(Flaminio Piana Canova)
 Piana Canova PC.100
 Piana Canova PC.500

Piattelli
(Piattelli, Fidia)
 Piattelli PH-3
 Piattelli PH-7

Pierce
(Percy Pierce)
 Pierce 0-2-1
 Pierce 1909 glider

Peyret
(Louis Peyret)
 Peyret Alérion Tandem

Piermarcucci 
(Société Piermarcucci / Marcucci, Pier)
 Piermarcucci TST-3 
 Piermarcucci TST-8 DM

PIK
(Polyteknikkojen Ilmailukerho)
 PIK-1
 PIK-2
 PIK-3
 PIK-3a Kanttikolmonen
 PIK-3b
 PIK-3c Kajava
 PIK-4
 PIK-5 Cumulus
 PIK-6
 PIK-7 Harakka
 PIK-12
 PIK-13
 PIK-14
 PIK-16 Vasama
 PIK-17a Tumppi
 PIK-17b Tintti
 PIK-20 Tiu
 PIK-22
 PIK-24 Pileus
 PIK-30

Pilatus 
(Pilatus Aircraft)
 B4

Pilcher 
(Percy Sinclair Pilcher)
 Pilcher Bat 1895
 Pilcher Beetle 1895
 Pilcher Hawk 1897
 Pilcher Triplane 1899

Pimoule
(J. Pimoule)
 Pimoule 1922 glider

Piotrków
(Piotrków Secondary School / Piotrkówa Uczniów)
 Piotrków School 1913 glider

Piper Aircraft 
 Piper TG-8
 Piper LBP
 Piper LNP

Pipistrel
(Pipistrel d.o.o Ajdovščina)
 Pipistrel Apis
 Pipistrel Apis-Bee
 Pipistrel Sinus
 Pipistrel Taurus
 Pipistrel Virus
 Albastar AS 18 – Albastar production

Pitrman-Pešta
(František Pitrman & František Pešta / Dílny PO MLL Praha, Maniny)
 Pitrman-Pešta PP-1 Tulák 37

Planar
(Planar Industria Aeronáutica S.A. - Argentina)
 Planar ASK-18 AR

Platz
(Reinhold Platz – Netherlands)
 Platz Zeilvliegtuig

Ploszajski
(Jerzy Ploszajski)
 Ploszajski KLS-II

Polikarpov
(Nikolaj Polikarpov / AMI)
 Polikarpov BDP
 Polikarpov BDP-2
 Polikarpov MP
 Polikarpov PB

Politechnika Warszawska
(Warsaw Polytechnic)
 Politechnika Warszawska PW-1 ULS
 Politechnika Warszawska PW-2 Gapa
 Politechnika Warszawska PW-2D – Mannschaft LKK – aka DWLKK PW-2D
 Politechnika Warszawska PW-3 Bakcyl
 Politechnika Warszawska PW-3V
 Politechnika Warszawska PW-4 Pelikan – Mannschaft LKK
 Politechnika Warszawska PW-5 Smyk – Roman Switkiewicz
 Politechnika Warszawska PW-6 – Roman Switkiewicz

Polyt 
(Polyteknisk Flyvegruppe – Polytechnic flying club)
 Polyt I
 Polyt II
 Polyt III
 Polyt IV

Poncelet
(Paul Poncelet / Société Anonyme Belge de Construction Aéronautique)
 Poncelet Castar – Poncelet, Paul – SABCA (Société Anonyme Belge de Construction Aéronautique)
 Poncelet Vivette – Poncelet, Paul – SABCA (Société Anonyme Belge de Construction Aéronautique)

Popa
(Ovidiu Popa)
 Popa OP-1 – (Ovidiu Popa)
 Popa OP-22 – (Ovidiu Popa)

Popiou
(George Popiou)
 Popiou GEP

Porte-Pirie
(Lieutenant John Cyrill Porte and Lieutenant Pirie)
 Porte-Pirie 1909 glider

Posnansky-Fronius
(Herman Posnansky & Bob Fronius)
 Posnansky-Fronius PF-1 White Knight

Potez
(Henry Potez)
 Potez P-VIII

Pottier 
(Avions Pottier)
 Pottier JP 14-34
 Pottier JP 15-40

Poznań Aviation Circle
(Poznań Aviation Circle Motyl / Michal Bohattrew)
 Poznań Aviation Circle Motyl (Butterfly) No.20 – Second Polish Glider Contest 17 May – 15 June 1925

Pratt
(Percival Justin Pratt / AMSCO (Aircraft Manufactory and Supply Company)
 Pratt 1929 glider 
 Pratt 1934
 Pratt Stunter
 Pratt Two Seater
 Pratt Utility

Pratt-Read
 Pratt-Read PR-G1
 Pratt Read LNE-1
 Pratt-Read TG-32
 Pratt-Read LBE

Preiss
See also Schreder
 Preiss RHJ-7
 Preiss RHJ-8
 Preiss RHJ-9
 Preiss RHJ-10

Pretoria University
 Pretoria University Exulans

Princeton
 Princeton Sailwing II

ProFe 
(Czech Republic)
 ProFe Banjo
 ProFe Duo Banjo
 ProFe D-8 Moby Dick
 ProFe D-8 Straton
 ProFe D-7 Mini Straton
 ProFe D-10 Tukan

Projekt 8
(Projekt 8 I/S – Helge Petersen et al.)
 Projekt 8 Dolphin

Prue
(Irving Prue)
 Prue 160
 Prue 215
 Prue Two
 Prue IIA
 Prue Standard
 Prue Super Standard
 Prue UHP-1

PSU
(Pennsylvania State University)
 PSU Griffin

Purcell
(Thomas H. Purcell Jr.)
 Purcell Sea Sprite

Pützer 
(Alfons Pützer KG)
 Pützer Doppelraab
 Pützer Dohle
 Pützer Elster
 Pützer Motorraab
 Pützer SR.57 Bussard - :de:Pützer Bussard
 Pützer MS.60
 Pützer MS.75

P.W.S. 
(Podlaska Wytwórnia Samolotów)
 PWS-101
 PWS-102
 PWS-103

Pyshnov
(V. S. Pyshnov / AVF – Akademiya Vozdushnogo Flota – air fleet academy (built at the Aviarabotnik glider section))
 Pychnov Strij

P.Z.L.
(Państwowe Zakłady Lotnicze - State Aviation Works)
 P.Z.L. 22

PZL Bielsko
 PZL Bielsko SZD-51 Junior
 PZL Bielsko SZD-52 (Amber 15 Crocus)
 PZL Bielsko SZD-54 Perkoz (Grebe)
 PZL Bielsko SZD-55
 PZL Bielsko SZD-56 Diana
 PZL Bielsko SZD-59 Acro

PZL Krosno 
 PZL Krosno KR-02
 PZL Krosno KR-03 Puchatek – Jerzy Krawsczyk and Eugeniusz Pelczar
 Peregrine Sailplanes KR-03 (Puchatek)

PZL Mielec
 PZL M-3 Pliszka (Wagtail)

Notes

Further reading

External links

Lists of glider aircraft